Argentine tango or Tango Argentino or is a social dance. It may also refer to:

 Tango music as a musical genre
 Tango Argentino (musical), a musical created by Claudio Segovia. 
 Tango Argentino (film), 1969 Argentinian documentary

See also
 Tanghi Argentini, a Belgian live action short film nominated for an Oscar at the 80th Academy Awards.

Argentine tango